Steps Ahead is an American jazz fusion group.

History
The group arose out of spontaneous sessions at Seventh Avenue South, a jazz club in New York City owned by saxophonist Michael Brecker and trumpeter brother Randy Brecker. The first three albums were released under the name Steps, later changed to Steps Ahead, on Nippon Columbia in Japan, starting with the debut live album Smokin' in the Pit (1980), followed by Step By Step (1981) and Paradox (1982).

The shifting roster has included vibraphonist Mike Mainieri, saxophonists Michael Brecker, Bob Berg, Bendik Hofseth, Bill Evans, Ernie Watts, and Donny McCaslin; pianists Don Grolnick, Eliane Elias, Warren Bernhardt and Rachel Z; guitarists Mike Stern, Chuck Loeb, and Steve Khan; bassists Eddie Gomez, Darryl Jones, Tony Levin, Victor Bailey, Richard Bona, and Marc Johnson; and drummers Steve Gadd, Peter Erskine, Steve Smith, and Dennis Chambers.

Steps Ahead was active during the 1970s and 1980s, intermittently during the 1990s, and reunited for concerts in the mid-2000s.

Discography

As Steps 
 Step by Step (Better Days, 1980) – recorded in 1980
 Smokin' in the Pit (Better Days, 1981) – recorded in 1979
 Paradox: Live at Seventh Avenue South (Better Days, 1982) – recorded in 1981

As Steps Ahead 
 Steps Ahead (Elektra/Musician, 1983)
 Modern Times (Elektra/Musician, 1984)
 Magnetic (Elektra, 1986)
 N.Y.C. (Capitol/Intuition, 1989)
 Yin-Yang (NYC, 1992)
 Live in Tokyo 1986 (NYC, 1994)
 Vibe (NYC, 1995)
 Holding Together (NYC, 2002)[2CD] – live rec. 1999
 Steppin' Out with WDR Big Band (Jazzline, 2016)

Members

Current members
Mike Stern - guitar (1999-present)
Mike Mainieri - vibraphone (1979-present)
Eliane Elias - keyboard (1983-1985;1992-present)
Eddie Gomez - bass (1979-2002;2016-present)
Steve Smith - drum (1996-present)

References

External links
 [ AllMusic]
 
 

Jazz fusion ensembles
American jazz ensembles from New York City
Elektra Records artists